Shahzar Rizvi (born 18 June 1994) Is an Indian Ace shooter. As a shooter, competing in the 10 metre air pistol event, he won a gold medal in the 2018 ISSF World Cup and in 2017 Commonwealth Shooting Championships. Shahzar shot a world record score of 242.3 points in the final to clinch Gold on his debut in ISSF World Cup.

Shahzar Rizvi started his career in 2009. In 2018 he defeated all the gold medalist Olympians in ISSF World Cup in Mexico with Omprakash Mitharwal. Rizvi is a Team Member of A Team with Manu Bhaker and Omprkash Mitharwal. He created a World Record with a score 242.3 points.

Early life
His early life was spent in Mawana Khurd, a small village in Meerut, India. He is eldest among three siblings.

References

External links

1994 births
Living people
Indian male sport shooters
ISSF pistol shooters
21st-century Indian people